Valero Iriarte (c. 1680, Zaragoza - c. 1753, Madrid) was a Spanish Baroque painter; specializing in portraits.

Life and work
While still a young man, he left home and went to Madrid. In 1711, after creating a portrait of the Prince of Asturias, then only four years old, he was given free access to the palace and received numerous commissions from King Philip V and his wife, Elisabeth Farnese. In 1720, he applied for the position of "Painter to the King", made vacant by the death of Nicolò Maria Vaccaro, but did not receive the appointment. Two years later, the Council of Castile appointed him "Appraiser of Antique Paintings".

Although trained in the conventional Baroque style, he was exposed to the works of French painters at the court; especially notable in the backgrounds of three scenes from Don Quixote which were commissioned by Elisabeth.

Many of his portraits, done in traditional style, show the influence of Juan Carreño de Miranda, but also incorporate novelties he acquired from the French portraitists, Jean Ranc and Michel-Ange Houasse, which made him popular among the bourgeoisie as well as the aristocracy.

References

Further reading 
 Alfonso E. Pérez Sánchez, Pintura barroca en España 1600-1750, 1992, Ediciones Cátedra S.A.

External links 

 Valero Iriarte @ the Enciclopedia Online del Museo del Prado

1680s births
1750s deaths
Spanish painters
Spanish portrait painters
People from Zaragoza